Hypericum sect. Thornea is a small section of flowering plants in the genus Hypericum. It was formerly treated as a separate genus, Thornea. There are two species in the section, Hypericum calcicola and Hypericum matudae.

References

Hypericum
Plant sections